Pilli Subhash Chandra Bose is an Indian politician. He was elected to the Rajya Sabha, upper house of the Parliament of India from Andhra Pradesh in the 2020 Rajyasabha elections as a member of the YSR Congress Party.

He served as the Deputy Chief Minister of Andhra Pradesh. He was a member of Andhra Pradesh Legislative Council.

Political career
He represented the Ramachandrapuram Assembly Constituency. He belongs to the YSR Congress Party and is a loyalist to Y.S.Rajasekhara Reddy's family.

He was also minister twice in the YS Rajasekhara Reddy's cabinet and once in former chief minister Konijeti Rosaiah's cabinet. He resigned as an MLA from Ramachandrapuram as well as K. Rosaiah's cabinet to join the YSR Congress party a party led by Y. S. Jaganmohan Reddy son of YS Rajasekhara Reddy.

In 2019, he became one of the five Deputy Chief Ministers of Andhra Pradesh in the Y. S. Jaganmohan Reddy led cabinet and was also given a charge of Minister of Revenue, Registration and Stamps.

After the Government of Andhra Pradesh decided to abolish the Andhra Pradesh Legislative Council, YSR Congress decided to send him to Rajya Sabha because he was a member of the Andhra Pradesh Legislative Council.

References

Andhra Pradesh MLAs 2009–2014
People from Vizianagaram district
YSR Congress Party politicians
Members of the Andhra Pradesh Legislative Council
Living people
1955 births
Indian National Congress politicians
Deputy Chief Ministers of Andhra Pradesh